Roy Simmons may refer to:

 Roy Simmons (American football) (1956–2014), American football guard
 Roy Simmons Sr. (1901–1994), American lacrosse coach
 Roy Simmons Jr. (born 1935), American lacrosse coach and son of Roy, Sr.